Félix Mantilla was the defending champion but he lost in the first round to Kenneth Carlson.

Adrian Voinea won in the final against Stefan Koubek 1–6, 7–5, 7–6(2).

Seeds

Draw

Finals

Top half

Bottom half

References

Bournemouth International - Singles, 1999
Brighton International